555 may refer to:

 555 (number)
 555, a year of the Julian calendar
 555 (1988 film), a direct-to-video horror film
 555 (telephone number), a telephone prefix commonly used in films and works of fiction
 555, a Thai-language internet slang equivalent to LOL
 "555", a song by Sebastian Ingrosso
 "555", a song performed by the band Phish and written by Mike Gordon
 "555", a song by Jimmy Eat World
 5:55, an album by Charlotte Gainsbourg
 555 BC, a year of the 6th century BC
 555 timer IC, an integrated circuit used in a variety of timer, pulse generation, and oscillator applications
 Ainthu Ainthu Ainthu or Five Five Five or 555, an Indian film
 Kamen Rider 555, also called Kamen Rider Faiz, a Japanese tokusatsu television series
 State Express 555, a brand of cigarette
 Stagecoach bus route 555, bus route from Lancaster to Keswick in England